Anathallis caudatipetala is a species of orchid plant native to Peru.

References 

caudatipetala
Flora of Peru